Juozas Bagdonas can refer to:

 Juozas Bagdonas (painter) (1911–2005), Lithuanian painter
 Juozas Bagdonas (rower) (born 1968), Lithuanian Olympic rower